Bess or Bessus was a legendary Danish general mentioned in Gesta Danorum. His master, Prince Gram gave his wife to him after he grew tired of her. Later Bess served as the principal general of Gram during his invasion of Sweden and led the negotiations with the future wife of Gram, Groa. After Gram married Groa, Bess urged the continuation of war, which eventually led to the death of the Swedish king.

The text

References

Legendary Norsemen